The 1985–86 Duke Blue Devils men's basketball team represented Duke University. The head coach was Mike Krzyzewski. The team played its home games in the Cameron Indoor Stadium in Durham, North Carolina, and was a member of the Atlantic Coast Conference.

Roster

Schedule

|-
!colspan=9 style=| Regular season

|-
!colspan=12 style=| ACC tournament

|-
!colspan=12 style=| NCAA tournament

Awards and honors
Mike Krzyzewski, ACC Coach of the Year
Johnny Dawkins, Naismith College Player of the Year

Team players drafted into the NBA

References

External links
 Schedule and results via Sports Reference

Duke
Duke Blue Devils men's basketball seasons
NCAA Division I men's basketball tournament Final Four seasons
Duke
1985 in sports in North Carolina
1986 in sports in North Carolina